Mayorazgo Palace (Palacio del Mayorazgo) is a rural palace in Inguanzo, Cabrales, Asturias, Spain, built in the 17th and 18th centuries.  It has two stories and a compact rectangular floor plan; it lacks an interior patio.  Two arrowslits flank the door on the front façade.  This front door is surrounded by molding and topped by a stone with decorative carvings.  Above the door is a large decorative shield.

References

Palaces in Asturias
Bien de Interés Cultural landmarks in Asturias